Nguyễn Thượng Hiền High School is a public high school in Hồ Chí Minh City, Vietnam. It was established in 1970 under the name Tân Bình High School. Being one of the four advanced public magnet schools in the city, Nguyễn Thượng Hiền ranks thirtieth nationally in the 2012 Vietnam university admission ranking.

History
In 1969, the school rented some rooms from Nhan Van Private School (now Banh Van Tran Primary School) to conduct its first academic year 1969/1970. In the next academic year, 1970/1971, the school relocated to its present location due to the completion of the campus construction. The new campus was a two-storeyed building with 12 rooms.

In the academic year 1973-74, the school was renamed as Nguyễn Thượng Hiền School in honor of Nguyễn Thượng Hiền. However, twelve years later, the government decided to change the name to Nguyễn Văn Trỗi High School. Soon after, however, the school was renamed again as Nguyễn Thượng Hiền High School.

Facilities

The school covers over 21,000 m² of land and is divided into many blocks. The school now has 58 classrooms with the average number of students per class in academic year 2009-2010 is 42.

Functional rooms
 Most rooms are equipped with two air-conditioners, LCD TVs and computers to aid the teaching with presentations.
 The Informatics Section with 4 rooms containing 40 computers each.
 3 laboratories for Chemistry, Physics and Biology.

Library
The library, which has an area of 300m2, is located behind the Teacher's Hall with over 20,000 books in various fields and 6 attached computers. It has been considered as one of the largest libraries in high schools in Ho Chi Minh City.
There is also a foreign language library in the Administrative Block.

Multipurpose gymnasium

The school's gymnasium has an area of 800m2 and is used for physical education. There is also a parking lot in its basement. The swimming pool and soccer field are located next to the gymnasium.

Principals

Extra-curricula activities

There is a wide range of extra-curricula activities, which are compulsory for grade 10 and 11 students, to choose: volleyball, soccer, basketball, swimming, table tennis, martial arts, aerobics, bodybuilding, musical performance, belly dance, Physics-Chemistry experiment, English club and IT club.

References

External links
Official website
Nguyen Thuong Hien High School forum
Alumni website

High schools in Vietnam
High schools in Ho Chi Minh City
Schools in Vietnam